Jonathan "Jonte" Hedström (born 27 December 1977) is a Swedish former professional ice hockey left winger.

Playing career 
Hedström was drafted by the Toronto Maple Leafs with their 9th round pick, 221st overall, in the 1997 NHL Entry Draft. In June 2000 he was traded the Mighty Ducks of Anaheim for 6th (Vadim Sozinov) and 7th (Markus Seikola) round selections in the 2000 NHL Entry Draft.

After only having played three playoff games with Anaheim in the 2006 Stanley Cup Playoffs, Hedström decided to return to Skellefteå in Sweden and be with his pregnant wife. On 15 August 2006, he signed a four-year deal with Timrå IK of the Elitserien (SEL) and joined than in September 2008 to HC CSKA Moscow in the Kontinental Hockey League (KHL). He left Russian club HC CSKA Moscow and signed with Swedish club Luleå HF prior to the 2009–10 season. He only remained in Luleå for one year before signing with Kärpät of the SM-liiga prior to the 2010–11 season.

Hedström left Kärpät mid-season and, surprisingly, signed with the Swedish Division 1 team Asplöven HC for the rest of the 2010–11 season. On 18 August 2011, Hedström signed a one-year contract with Timrå IK to return to his former team. On November 19, 2013, Hedström officially announced his retirement from hockey.

Awards 
 Silver medal at the 2004 World Championship.

Career statistics

Regular season and playoffs

International

References

External links 
 
 Hedström retires (Swedish)

1977 births
Asplöven HC players
Cincinnati Mighty Ducks players
Djurgårdens IF Hockey players
Expatriate ice hockey players in Russia
HC CSKA Moscow players
IF Sundsvall Hockey players
Living people
Luleå HF players
Mighty Ducks of Anaheim players
Oulun Kärpät players
People from Skellefteå Municipality
Piteå HC players
Skellefteå AIK players
Swedish expatriate sportspeople in Russia
Swedish expatriate ice hockey players in the United States
Swedish ice hockey forwards
Timrå IK players
Toronto Maple Leafs draft picks
Sportspeople from Västerbotten County